This article uses Logar transcription.

The Istrian dialect is a Slovene dialect spoken in Slovene Istria, as well as some settlements in Italy and Croatia. The dialect borders the Inner Carniolan dialect to the north and northeast, the Southern Chakavian and Buzet dialects to the south, the Southwestern Istrian dialect to the southeast, and the Čičarija dialect to the east. The dialect belongs to the Littoral dialect group, and it evolved from Lower Carniolan dialect base.

Geographical distribution 
The dialect is spoken in Slovene Istria in most of the rural areas of the municipalities of Koper, Izola, Ankaran, and Piran, as well as by the Slovenes living in the Italian municipalities of Muggia and San Dorligo della Valle, in the southern suburbs of Trieste—Servola and Cattinara—and the Croatian villages of Slum and Brest. Notable settlements include Koper, Izola, Ankaran, Strunjan, Piran, Portorož, Dragonja, Vanganel, Marezige, Dekani, Spodnje Škofije, and Črni Kal in Slovenia, and Muggia, Stramare, San Dorligo della Valle, and Trieste in Italy.

Accentul changes 
The Istrian dialect has lost pitch accent on both long and short vowels, and the Šavrin Hills subdialect has lost differentiation between long and short vowels completely, whereas the Rižana subdialect is in the late stages of losing differentiation. It has undergone the  → ,   → ,  → ,  → , and (partially)  /  →  /  (e.g.) shifts.

Phonology 
The dialect's phonology is in many aspects very close to the Inner Carniolan dialect, but in some features it barely shows similarities with other dialects from the Lower Carniolan dialect base. In the Istrian dialect, however, it diphthongized again, this time into . Stressed  and  turned into . Short  turned into  in all positions and  turned into . In the Šavrin Hills subdialect, diphthongs have monophthongized for a second time;  turned into ,  and  turned into .

Newly accented  turned into  in the north and into / in the south, and newly accented  remained  in the north, but turned into / in the south. Newly accented  turned into  in the south.

Velar  remained velar before central and back vowels. The second Slavic palatalization is still present for dorsal consonants in the north:  →//,  → ,  → /. Final  turned into .

Morphology 
The preposition pri is used with the genitive instead of the locative. Apart from that, the morphology is poorly researched, but it is probably close to the Inner Carniolan dialect.

Subdivision 

The Istrian dialect is split into two subdialects: the northern, more archaic Rižana subdialect and the southern Šavrin Hills subdialect, which is more influenced by Croatian. The main differences are monophthongization and the loss of length differentiation in the Šavrin Hills dialect.

References

Bibliography 

 
 

Slovene dialects